Lindsay is an American docuseries that documents actress Lindsay Lohan's rehabilitation recovery and work following a public period of struggles in her personal life and career. The series premiered on March 9, 2014, on the Oprah Winfrey Network, and concluded on April 20, 2014. Premiere ratings were described as "modest" and then dropped, while critical reception was mixed.

Background and production
In July 2013, an Oprah Winfrey Network spokesperson confirmed that Oprah Winfrey had reached a deal to do a one-on-one interview with Lohan for Oprah's Next Chapter, to be followed by an eight-episode series. The interview was Lohan's first interview post-rehab. Filming of Lindsay began in August 2013 in New York City. Network promotion described the series as an "honest, no-holds-barred account" of Lohan's life. It was directed by Amy Rice, who previously co-directed the 2009 HBO documentary By the People: The Election of Barack Obama.

Reception
The premiere had 693,000 viewers, described as "so-so" by The Hollywood Reporter and "modest" by Entertainment Weekly. It had the highest ratings of OWN's 2014 unscripted premieres, and with young women 18–34, ratings were up 231% from the previous year. In comparison, the 2013 interview with Lohan on Oprah's Next Chapter drew 892,000 viewers. By the second episode, ratings had dropped by 24% to 527,000 viewers, and with OWN's target demographic of women 25–54 years old, ratings dropped by 36%. The penultimate episode had 468,000 viewers and the two-hour finale ratings were down to 406,000.

David Hinckley of New York Daily News said the first episode was "surprisingly routine" adding "it's unlikely she could do anything in front of Oprah's cameras that would slam into or clear the bar she has set in the past." Brian Lowry of Variety described the first episode as boring, and said that OWN and Lohan were "using each other" adding that "'Lindsay' says far more about OWN than it does about Lohan." Liz Smith found the series "compelling" and "usually painful to watch", and she also said that "[Lohan], clearly, had no part in the editing." Daniel D'Addario of Salon called the series "an unmitigated disaster" and "a strange clash of dueling brands" and criticized the way the network handled the disclosure of Lohan's miscarriage.

Episodes

References

External links

2010s American reality television series
2014 American television series debuts
2014 American television series endings
Oprah Winfrey Network original programming
English-language television shows
Lindsay Lohan